Ane Hansdatter Kismul (born 8 March 1980 in Mosjøen) is a Norwegian environmentalist and politician for the Centre Party.

She joined Nature and Youth in 1996 and started a new local chapter in Mosjøen. In 2000 she was elected deputy leader and from 2003 to 2005 she was leader of the organization. She completed a bachelor's degree in political science at the University of Oslo in 2007. She was general secretary of the Norwegian Wind Energy Association in 2006 and 2007, when she was hired as advisor for the Centre Party's parliamentary group.

In July 2008, she was appointed as political advisor in the Ministry of Agriculture and Food. In September 2012 she was promoted to State Secretary in the Ministry of Petroleum and Energy.

References

1980 births
Living people
People from Vefsn
Norwegian environmentalists
Norwegian women environmentalists
Nature and Youth activists
Centre Party (Norway) politicians
Norwegian state secretaries
21st-century Norwegian politicians